William Alton Jones (April 19, 1891 – March 1, 1962), was president of the oil and gas conglomerate Cities Service Company (now CITGO). He was an influential industrialist, philanthropist, and close personal friend of United States President Dwight D. Eisenhower.

Biography
Jones was born into a poor Missouri farm family of seven in 1891.  He married his childhood sweetheart, Nettie Marie Marvin in 1914. In 1920 he became an executive with the energy company Cities Service Company, serving as president from 1940 to 1953. He rose to become one of the highest-paid CEOs in the United States.
During World War II, he became a hero of war production by building a secret dynamite production plant in Arkansas, an aviation fuel refinery in Louisiana, and over 3,000 miles of oil pipelines from Texas to the East Coast that were vital to the war effort.

As an important supporter of the Republican Party, he met and became a very close personal friend of President Eisenhower. Jones was killed in the crash of American Airlines Flight 1 in New York City on March 1, 1962, while on his way to join Eisenhower on a fishing trip.

In 1944 he founded the W. Alton Jones Foundation "to promote the well-being and general good of mankind  the world".  The foundation supported various causes, such as the arts, education, and environmental activism, but split into three separate funds in 2001.

Immediately after his death, Jones' heirs donated his private hunting and fishing retreat (which had hosted President Eisenhower and the King of Nepal) to the University of Rhode Island, creating the W. Alton Jones Campus.

See also 
 The W. Alton Jones Cell Science Center
 Burl S. Watson, Jones' successor and President during his tenure as CEO.

Notes

External links 
 W. Alton Jones Campus, University of Rhode Island
 The Whispering Pines Conference Center—official site
 W. Alton Jones Foundation
 Nettie Jones Obituary

1891 births
1962 deaths
20th-century American businesspeople
People from Webb City, Missouri
Businesspeople from Missouri
Accidental deaths in New York (state)
20th-century American philanthropists
Victims of aviation accidents or incidents in 1962
Victims of aviation accidents or incidents in the United States